Déportivo is a French rock band from Bois-d'Arcy, Yvelines, a suburb of Paris.

About the band
There are three members in the band:
 Jérôme Coudanne – guitar, vocals (songwriter)
 Richard Magnac – bass
 Julien Bonnet – drums
The trio mainly composes songs in French, though it has written several in English as well. Personal topics dominate.

The group's first album, Parmi eux, was released in 2004 and sold about 60,000 copies. The second one, eponymously titled  but with an unaccented E instead of É, came out in 2007.

There is no word déportivo in French; the name of the band most likely comes from the Spanish deportivo (a reference to the same-named football club is possible).

Discography

Other releases
 Parmi eux (édition limitée)
 Parmi eux (réédition)
 La salade (maxi)
 First
 Parmi eux (promo)
 1000 moi-même (promo)
 Roma (promo)
 Deportivo (CD + DVD)
 La brise (promo)

References

External links
 Déportivo official site
 Dans mon monde – unofficial site

French rock music groups
Musical groups established in 2004
2004 establishments in France
Musical groups from Île-de-France